Ángel Ortega García (born 20 November 1989 in Valencia, Valencian Community) is a Spanish footballer who plays as a right back for CD Roda.

References

External links

1989 births
Living people
Sportspeople from Castellón de la Plana
Spanish footballers
Footballers from the Valencian Community
Association football defenders
Segunda División players
Segunda División B players
Tercera División players
Villarreal CF C players
Villarreal CF B players
SD Eibar footballers
UD Alzira footballers
Ontinyent CF players
CD Eldense footballers
Atlético Saguntino players